The Yamaha P-115 is a portable digital piano introduced in 2015. It replaces its best-selling predecessor, the P-105.

The P-115 has 14 different voices which range from Grand Piano to Rock Organ, and comes pre-loaded with 64 preset songs. There is a built in metronome as well as a built in recorder which can store roughly 100 KB (11,000 notes) for play back or upload to an external device. Keys are Yamaha's Graded hammer standard (GHS) which range in weight from the low keys to high keys to more accurately mimic the feel of an acoustic piano. The overall weight of the keyboard is 26 pounds. The keyboard can come in colors black or white (p115B or p115WH).

Features
 64 preset songs (14 demo, 50 piano)
 USB to host line
 AUX out ([L/L+R][R])
 2 6.3mm front-facing headphone jacks
 Pedal output to accompany either a standard pedal or Yamaha's LP-5 three pedal unit.

See also
Yamaha P-85
Yamaha P-120
Yamaha P-250
List of Yamaha products

References

External links
 Yamaha P115 Review by Piano Nadu
Yamaha P115 Guide

P-115